Sir Seretse Khama International Airport , located  north of downtown Gaborone, is the main international airport of the capital city of Botswana. The airport is named after Sir Seretse Khama, the first president of Botswana. It was opened in 1984 to handle regional and international traffic. It has the largest passenger movement in the country. In 2017 the airport got its first special economic zone which will house in the following departments: CAAB, Botswana Innovation Hub, ITPA and diamond hub for diamond sector.

History
British Airways discontinued its flight to London's Heathrow Airport via Johannesburg in 1999.

Airlines and destinations

This flight operates between Addis Ababa and Gaborone via Victoria Falls, however Ethiopian Airlines does not have rights to transport passengers solely between Gaborone and Victoria Falls.

Incidents and accidents

On 11 October 1999, an Air Botswana pilot, Captain Chris Phatswe, commandeered a parked Aérospatiale ATR 42 aircraft A2-ABB without authorization in the early morning and took off. Once in the air, he asked by radio to speak to the president, Air Botswana's general manager, the station commander, central police station and his girlfriend, among others. Because the president was out of the country, he was allowed to speak to the vice president. In spite of all attempts to persuade him to land and discuss his grievances, he stated he was going to crash into some aircraft on the apron. After a total flying time of about 2 hours, he did two loops and then crashed at  into Air Botswana's two other ATR 42s parked on the apron. The captain was killed but there were no other casualties.

Airline sources say the pilot had been grounded on medical reasons, refused reinstatement and regrounded until February 2000. Air Botswana operations were crippled, as the airline temporarily only had one aircraft left – a BAe 146 that was grounded with technical problems.

Statistics

Botswana Defence Force Air Wing
Botswana Defence Force Air Wing VIP Flight Wing is based at the airport.

References

External links

Airports established in 1984
Transport in Gaborone
Airports in Gaborone
1984 establishments in Botswana